Sure Shot Redemption is the debut solo album by the Black Sheep member Dres. It was released in 1999 through Ground Control Records.

Critical reception
Exclaim! wrote that Dres's "voice still boasts a suave demeanour and shines on jazzy selections 'As I Look Back' and 'Hi & Lo', but his lyrical content is now reflective and spiritual; no strobe light honeys here." Miami New Times thought that "on slower songs like 'As I Look Back' and 'Hi & Lo', Dres unveils the wise man that always seemed nascent in Black Sheep's wiseass tone."

Track listing
"Pardon Me" (Single)
"As I Look Back"
"Damn Right"
"Hi & Lo"
"Never Say" (featuring The Legion)
"Start of Somethin' Big"
"Sky's the Limit" (featuring The Legion)
"Endz"
"It's Going Down" (featuring Chi-Ali and Droop Dog)
"Back 2 Back"
"You're So Vain" (featuring Horace Brown)
"Night Time" (featuring Vicki Miles)
"Grand Groove"
"Straight Paper"
"Tru Kings"

References

1999 albums
Hip hop albums by American artists